The Hôtel de Boadès is a listed hôtel particulier in Aix-en-Provence.

Location
It is located at 8, place Jeanne d'Arc in the center of Aix-en-Provence.

History

In 1935, Blanche d’Estienne de Saint Jean, an heiress to the Château du Grand-Saint-Jean, donated it the city of Aix-en-Provence and asked them to donate the proceeds to the Academy of Aix-en-Provence.

It is now home to city administration offices.

Heritage significance
It has been listed as a historical building since 1947.

References

Hôtels particuliers in Aix-en-Provence
Monuments historiques of Aix-en-Provence